is a Japanese professional footballer who currently plays as a left back for Hong Kong Premier League club Lee Man.

Club career
On 15 July 2022, Lee Man announced the signing of Tachibana.

References

1996 births
Living people
Sportspeople from Osaka Prefecture
Association football people from Osaka Prefecture
Japanese footballers
Japanese expatriate footballers
Association football defenders
Montenegrin Second League players
Montenegrin First League players
Hong Kong Premier League players
FK Cetinje players
OFK Petrovac players
Lee Man FC players
Japanese expatriate sportspeople in Montenegro
Japanese expatriate sportspeople in Hong Kong
Expatriate footballers in Montenegro
Expatriate footballers in Hong Kong